Glenlyon is a small village in the Shire of Hepburn local government area, Victoria, Australia around 10 km from Daylesford along the Daylesford - Malmsbury Road, and around 101 km from the Melbourne CBD via Kyneton and Malmsbury.

It is on the Loddon River.

Glenlyon is well known for its main street of old European trees lending an "Englishness" to the village and providing a cooling canopy in the heat of summer.

As at the 2016 Commonwealth Census, the village of Glenlyon & its immediate hinterland (the census district includes the localities/hamlets of Denver, Porcupine Ridge, parts of Wheatsheaf) had a population of 389 people.
The median age of the local population is 50 as of 2011.  The top 5 cultural backgrounds of the local population are broken up into 30% claiming English heritage, 20% Australian heritage, 13.5% Irish, 11.9% Scottish and 3.3% Germany - however of these numbers 74.9% were actually born in Australia, 5.8% in England and 3% in New Zealand.  84.7% only spoke English at home.  A reflection of the village as the location of many commuters to either Daylesford, Ballarat or even Melbourne and reflecting the fact that the locale is a popular retirement, weekender, holiday home or hobby farm location is that 44.1% are employed in professional or managerial roles with 13.9% as tradesmen and 21.9% as clerical or public servants.  Only 6.6% work in rural or farming.

Glenlyon has a rich agricultural industry amongst the surrounding areas.
Cattle and sheep are largely stocked throughout the district supplying meat products and wool to the local and global markets.
Potatoes, cereal crops (both for hay and grain), organic vegetables, vegetable seed and lucerne grow in the rich volcanic soil. 
The contrast of green pastures, grazing livestock, bright red ploughed paddocks and golden stubble paddocks across the rolling countryside, make the scenery in the area very special to the locals and visitors alike.

History
In 1846, Richard Babington and John Carpenter purchased a part of the Holcombe Run (originally part of A.F. Mollisons Coliban Run) and called it Glenlyon after their Scottish home.

Glenlyon Post Office opened around May 1858 and closed in 1973.

Glenlyon once had a primary school and hotels but all are closed.

The original general store operated until approx 2009 when it closed.  A new general store opened in the old premises, bringing to the town a revitalised heart.  The revitalised store, which is well utilised by tourists passing through does duty as a cafe with an outdoor eating area and selected  groceries.  Beside the store is the local community notice board.

The historic old Shire Hall in the main street, once home of the Shire of Glenlyon before it merged with the neighbouring Borough of Daylesford in May 1966 (itself the subject of the local council reorganisations in 1995 into the bigger Shire of Hepburn) is used as a public hall. The Glenlyon Progress Association is the designated "owner" of the Hall.  In 2017/18 a large amount of funding was received from Regional Development Victoria to renovate the Hall, which reopened in March 2018 to great acclaim.

A village market is also held in and around the Glenlyon Hal on the third Saturday of the month.l

The nearby Glenlyon Recreation Reserve (in Dysart Street) is also the location of a mineral spring and picnic ground  (like those that exist in Hepburn Springs but with no crowds) with a bore and hand pump allowing visitors to 'sample' for themselves the heavily mineralised water.  The spring is located to the far side of the recreation reserve along the unsealed Suttons Lane.  Parking and BBQ facilities are provided at the spring.

Glenlyon Recreation Reserve is also home to the Glenlyon & District Pony Club with events throughout the year.

The major activity held in Glenlyon is the annual Paint Glenlyon and Dee Waterhouse Memorial Art Prize Competition, held around the Easter break. Entrants must have painted a (recognisable) landscape in/around Glenlyon. With a first prize of $1000 it is one of the largest art prizes in regional Australia. This is sponsored and organised by the Glenlyon Progress Association.

Glenlyon District News is published monthly.

References 

Welcome to Glenlyon. Glenlyon Progress Association. Retrieved on 2008-04-28.
VICNAMES - Place Names. State Government of Victoria. Retrieved on 2008-04-28.

External links 

Welcome to Glenlyon - information about all associations, organisations and groups currently in Glenlyon, as well as a copy of the town newsletter and latest gossip.

Towns in Victoria (Australia)